The 1854 Town of Nelson by-election was a by-election held in the multi-member electorate of  during the 1st New Zealand Parliament, on 17 June 1854, and was the first by-election in New Zealand political history.

The Town of Nelson member of parliament William Travers and the neighbouring  electorate's MP William Cautley resigned on 26 May 1854, two days after the start of the first Parliamentary session of the 1st New Zealand Parliament.  On nomination day (17 June) Samuel Stephens and Francis Jollie were nominated (both candidates were nominated in absentia), and after a show of hands Stephens was declared elected. The outgoing MP Travers was subsequently elected two days later in the Waimea by-election, as expected, Jollie coming second.

Nomination meeting
The nomination meeting was held on Saturday, 17 June 1854 at the Court House. The Returning Officer was J. Poynter. No contest was expected, so a minimal number of electors were present. First the writ was read by Poynter, and after it was read Poynter called for the small number of electors to proceed with the nominations. As the first nomination, Mr. Webb proposed Francis Jollie, which was seconded by Mr. Cann. B. Walmsley nominated Samuel Stephens, seconded by the outgoing MP William T. L. Travers. Both the candidates could not come to the meeting, since Stephens was in the Auckland Region, and Jollie had moved to Peel Forest in Canterbury in late 1853, and therefore there were no speeches from the candidates. Following a show of hands, Stephens was declared elected, as Jollie's supporters did not demand a poll.

References

Nelson 1854
1854 elections in New Zealand
Politics of Nelson, New Zealand
June 1854 events